Series 21 of British television drama The Bill was broadcast from 5 January until 29 December 2005. The series consisted of 106 episodes, making it the series with the highest number of episodes in the show's final decade, tied with series 19. Joint-longest serving cast member, DC Jim Carver (Mark Wingett), exited the show after 21 years, having been with the show since its first ever episode; he was the sixth character with over ten years on the series to have exited in the previous three years. It followed the events of the third Sun Hill station fire. As was the case in 1990 and 2002, a redevelopment to a large part of the station set was explained by an explosion, racist PCSO Colin Fairfax driving a van into the station reception to shift the blame for a terror attack onto the local Asian community; the fire led to three characters being killed off. The death of Carver’s best friend in the blaze, DC Ken Drummond, came before the revelation that his estranged wife June Ackland had an affair with experienced PC Roger Valentine. Ackland, co-protagonist with Carver in the series pilot Woodentop, was involved in a 30-minute special episode that ended with Carver’s exit. Actor Mark Wingett also featured in spin-off documentary series The Bill: Uncovered, exploring Jim’s time on the show that included addictions to alcohol & gambling and two failed marriages. The final of four Uncovered documentaries saw Superintendent Adam Okaro narrate on some of the best moments from the show's 21-year history, however the episode did not air in the U.K; instead it aired in Australia a year after its originally planned broadcast.

This series saw the programme change executive producers for the final time, Paul Marquess, quitting after three and a half years in charge; his replacement Johnathan Young, who produced The Bill spinoff Murder Investigation Team, remained in charge until the series was cancelled in 2010. Young opted to remove of much of the 'soap' feel, which was introduced by Marquess, and the main focus turned back towards the actual policing aspect of the programme. The majority of this series however remained serialised, with the transition back to single-hander episodes being phased in slowly, following into Series 22. Young also launched a long-term storyline, Sergeant Dale Smith embarking on an affair with Louise Larson (Rosie Marcel), wife of a notorious criminal; the plot did not conclude until early 2006, and was the first of several multi-series storylines Young ran during his first 18 months in charge.

The series also saw its second live episode, commemorating the 50th anniversary of ITV, the special episode showing a siege in which several members of the relief are held hostage by a grieving father, seeking justice for his son's accidental death. The episode saw a return for Cyril Nri as Adam Okaro, whose time off-screen on break was preceded by the death of Okaro's wife and two children in a tragic car crash. The series also saw its third serial killer storyline in as many years as a homophobe killed a series of gay men, including PC Lance Powell. Another officer killed off was the show's primary villain, PC Gabriel Kent, who committed suicide after being exposed for stealing his adoptive brother's identity, while he had also committing a litany of crimes, including murder and rape, during a two-year reign of terror.

On 5 February 2014, the complete series was released on DVD in Australia as a Region 0, playable anywhere in the world.

Cast changes

Arrivals
 DC Jo Masters (Cure the Sin -)
 PCSO Laura Bryant (He Who Has No Will -) – Returning character
 PCSO Colin Fairfax (He Who Has No Will – Life's Too Short)
 PC Dan Casper (In the Driving Seat -)
 SRO Julian Tavell (Operation Mercury, Part 1 -)
 DC Zain Nadir (Moving Target -)
 DRO Rochelle Barratt (Maintain Cover – Back to Basics, Part 2)
 Ex-CPS Lawyer Jonathan Fox (One Step Too Far – A Small Price to Pay, Part 2) – Returning character
 Ch. Supt Ian Barratt (A Small Price to Pay, Part 3 – Back to Basics, Part 2)
 Supt. Amanda Prosser (Beggars and Bent Coppers – The Anniversary, Part 2)
 DS Mickey Webb (Back to Basics, Part 1 -) – Returning character
 PC Will Fletcher (Reunited -)

Departures
 DC Ken Drummond – Killed in the second Sun Hill disaster
 PC Andrea Dunbar – Killed in the second Sun Hill disaster
 SRO Marilyn Chambers – Dies in hospital following the second Sun Hill disaster
 DC Jim Carver – Leaves in the wake of the station fire
 PCSO Colin Fairfax – Arrested and jailed for the murder of his three colleagues
 DC Gary Best – Transfers back to Manchester after being shot on duty
 CPS Lawyer Jonathan Fox – Leaves after the breakup of his friendship with Gina Gold
 Supt. Amanda Prosser – Departs after handing control of the station back to Adam Okaro
 PC Gabriel Kent – Commits suicide after he is revealed as a murderer, rapist and impostor
 Chief Superintendent Ian Barratt – Moves away after discovering his wife had an affair with Dan Casper
 DRO Rochelle Barratt – Leaves Sun Hill to start a new life with her husband
 PC Sheelagh Murphy – Transfers to the Child Protection Unit
 PC Lance Powell – Murdered by a gay serial killer operating in Sun Hill
 PC Amber Johannsen – Resigns from the MET after deciding she is not cut out for the job

Episodes

References

2005 British television seasons
The Bill series